Bait is the soundtrack to the 2000 action-comedy film, Bait. It was released on September 12, 2000 by Warner Bros. Records and featured a blend of hip hop and R&B music. The soundtrack wasn't much of a success, only making it to #49 on the Top R&B/Hip-Hop Albums, but it did feature two fairly successful singles, Mýa's "Free" peaked at #42 on the Billboard Hot 100 and #52 on the Hot R&B/Hip-Hop Singles & Tracks, and also "Why Me?" by Cuban Link & Fat Joe.

Track listing
"Free"- 5:21 (Mýa) 
"Why Me?"- 3:26 (Cuban Link & Fat Joe)
"Icey"- 4:14 (Nelly & St. Lunatics)  
"Take It There"- 4:20 (Donell Jones) 
"Took the Bait"- 5:14 (Scarface & Dangerous)  
"Work"- 4:41 (The Roots & Alechia James)  
"Quick Rush"- 3:48 (Total & Missy Elliott)  
"L.I.Z."- 3:03 (Liz Leite)  
"You Can Get That"- 3:48 (No Question & Bianca)   
"I Love Being a Gangsta"- 5:11 (Major Figgas) 
"There's Nothing Better"- 4:25 (Beanie Sigel & Memphis Bleek) 
"Sex, Sex, Money, Money"- 4:31 (Ram Squad)  
"Remarkable"- 4:47 (Jaheim & Terry Dexter)  
"Can't Fuck With Me"- 3:59 (Trick Daddy, Lost Tribe & JV) 
"Where Is the Love?"- 4:44 (Majusty) 
"Bed Springs"- 4:01 (Jamie Foxx)

Hip hop soundtracks
2000 soundtrack albums
Warner Records soundtracks
Contemporary R&B soundtracks
Albums produced by Eddie F
Albums produced by Missy Elliott
Action film soundtracks
Comedy film soundtracks